Julio César Albino De Lucca  (born 28 April 1971 in Montevideo) is a former Uruguayan footballer.

International career
Albino made two appearances for the senior Uruguay national football team from 1993 to 1994.

References

External links
 

1971 births
Living people
Footballers from Montevideo
Uruguayan footballers
Uruguay international footballers
C.A. Progreso players
Defensa y Justicia footballers
Villa Española players
Uruguayan expatriate footballers
Expatriate footballers in Argentina

Association football forwards